Gaillardia coahuilensis, the bandanna daisy, is a North American species of flowering plant in the sunflower family. It is native to northwestern Mexico (Coahuila) and the southwestern United States (western Texas).

Gaillardia coahuilensis grows in calcareous soils. Each head has 5-10 2-colored ray flowers (red, yellow, or orange close to the center of the head, orange or yellow farther away from the center). These surround 40-100 yellow or reddish disc flowers.

References

coahuilensis
Flora of Coahuila
Flora of Texas
Plants described in 1977
Taxa named by Billie Lee Turner